Sir John Blackwood, 2nd Baronet (1721 – 27 February 1799) was an Irish politician and baronet.

He was the eldest son of Sir Robert Blackwood, 1st Baronet of Ballyleidy Blackwood entered the Irish House of Commons for Killyleagh in 1761 and sat for it until 1768. He was then returned for Bangor until 1776. He was member of parliament for Killyleagh again until 1790 and subsequently for Bangor until 1798. From the latter year to his death in 1799, he represented Killyleagh a third time.

He married Dorcas Stevenson (afterwards Dorcas Blackwood, Baroness Dufferin and Claneboye), eldest daughter and co-heir of James Stevenson, of Killyleagh, County Down (by his wife Ann, daughter of General Nicholas Price), son of Hans Stevenson by his wife Anne, daughter and eventually sole heiress of James Hamilton, of Neilsbrook, County Antrim, the nephew and sole heir of James Hamilton, 1st Viscount Claneboye, father of James Hamilton, 1st Earl of Clanbrassil. They had 11 children:

Robert Blackwood (1752–1786), MP for Killyleagh, died unmarried after he was killed falling off a horse.
James Stevenson Blackwood, 2nd Baron Dufferin and Claneboye (1755–1836)
Rev. John Blackwood (9 October 1757 – 5 January 1833), who married firstly in 1778 Sophia (who died in 1803), daughter of Hill Benson, Archdeacon of Down, and married secondly in 1803 Eliza, eldest daughter of Josias Dupré, of Wilton Park, Buckinghamshire and died without issue.
Hans Blackwood, 3rd Baron Dufferin and Claneboye (1758–1839)
Price Blackwood (24 January 1760 – 1816), who married firstly in 1787 Louisa (who died on 20 September 1802), second daughter and co-heir of William Southwell, and married secondly in 1804 Anne, second daughter of Richard Cox, of Castletown Cox, County Kilkenny, only son of Michael Cox, Archbishop of Cashel and died without issue.
Leeson Blackwood (1766–1804)
Sir Henry Blackwood, 1st Baronet, of the Navy (1770–1832)
four daughters Anne, Sophia, Dorcas and Catharine.  Anne married firstly John Ryder (Dean of Lismore) and secondly Reverend James Jones (died 1825), a Church of Ireland clergyman in Urney, County Tyrone, and son of Theophilus Jones Mp (1729–1811).

References
 

1722 births
1799 deaths
Baronets in the Baronetage of Ireland
Irish MPs 1761–1768
Irish MPs 1769–1776
Irish MPs 1776–1783
Irish MPs 1783–1790
Irish MPs 1790–1797
Irish MPs 1798–1800
Members of the Parliament of Ireland (pre-1801) for County Down constituencies
John